Grevillea granulifera is a species of flowering plant in the family Proteaceae and is endemic to eastern New South Wales. It is a shrub with narrowly elliptic leaves and clusters of pinkish-red and creamy-white flowers.

Description
The upper surface of the leaves is finely grainy, the lower surface silky-hairy and the edges usually curved downwards.

Taxonomy
This grevillea was first formally described in 1986 by Donald McGillivray who gave it the name Grevillea obtusiflora subsp. granulifera in his New Names in Grevillea (Proteaceae) from specimens collected by Lawrie Johnson near Mount George in 1980. In 1994, Peter M. Olde and Neil R. Marriott raised the subspecies to species level as Grevillea granulifera in the journal Telopea. The specific epithet (granulifera) means "bearing small grains".

Distribution and habitat
Grevillea granulifera grows in forest, often on ridge tops and hillsides and is found between Wollomombi Falls, Barrington Tops and Wingham.

References

granulifera
Proteales of Australia
Flora of New South Wales
Taxa named by Donald McGillivray
Plants described in 1986